Mycaranthes is a genus of orchids. It was previously considered as a synonym of the genus Eria, but eventually it has become an accepted name. Its species are native to Southeast Asia, China, the Himalayas and New Guinea.

Species

 M. anceps (Leav.) Cootes & W.Suarez - Palawan, Negros
 M. candoonensis (Ames) Cootes & W.Suarez - Mindanao
 M. citrina (Ridl.) Rauschert - Palawan, Borneo, Peninsular Malaysia
 M. clemensiae (Leav.) Cootes & W.Suarez - Philippines
 M. davaensis (Ames) Cootes & W.Suarez - Mindanao
 M. depauperata J.J.Wood - Sabah
 Mycaranthes farinosa (Ames & C.Schweinf.) J.J.Wood - Borneo
 Mycaranthes floribunda (D.Don) S.C.Chen & J.J.Wood - Yunnan, Assam, Bangladesh, Bhutan, Nepal, Myanmar, Thailand, Laos, Vietnam, Cambodia, Malaysia, Borneo 
 M. forbesiana (Kraenzl.) Rauschert - Sumatra 
 M. gigantea (Ames) Cootes & W.Suarez - Philippines
 M. hawkesii (A.H.Heller) Rauschert - New Guinea
 M. lamellata (Ames) Cootes & W.Suarez - Leyte, Mindanao
 M. latifolia Blume - Indonesia, Malaysia
 M. leucotricha (Schltr.) Rauschert - New Guinea
 M. lobata Blume - Indonesia
 M. longibracteata (Leav.) Cootes & W.Suarez - Philippines#
 Mycaranthes magnicallosa (Ames & C.Schweinf.) J.J.Wood - Sabah
 M. major (Ridl.) J.J.Wood - Borneo, Maluku, Philippines
 Mycaranthes melaleuca (Ridl.) J.J.Wood - Borneo
 Mycaranthes meliganensis J.J.Wood - Sabah
 M. merguensis (Lindl.) Rauschert - Myanmar, Thailand
 M. mindanaensis (Ames) Cootes & W.Suarez - Capiz, Sibuyan
 M. monostachya (Lindl.) Rauschert - Java, Sumatra
 M. nieuwenhuisii (J.J.Sm.) Rauschert - Borneo
 M. obliqua Lindl. - Borneo, Malaysia, Sumatra
 M. oblitterata Blume -Thailand, Vietnam, Cambodia, Malaysia, Java, Borneo, Sumatra, Bali 
 M. padangensis (Schltr.) Brieger - Sumatra
 Mycaranthes pannea (Lindl.) S.C.Chen & J.J.Wood - Guangxi, Guizhou, Hainan, Tibet, Yunnan, Bhutan, Cambodia, India, Assam, Borneo, Sumatra, Laos, Malaysia, Myanmar, Singapore, Thailand, Vietnam
 M. rhinoceros (Ridl.) Rauschert - Sumatra
 M. schistoloba (Schltr.) Rauschert - Sumatra
 M. sonkaris (Rchb.f.) Rauschert - Sumatra, Borneo, Sumbawa
 M. stenophylla (Schltr.) Rauschert - New Guinea
 M. tjadasmalangensis (J.J.Sm.) Rauschert - Java, Sumatra
 M. tricuspidata (Rolfe) Rauschert - Sulawesi
 M. vanoverberghii (Ames) Cootes, D.P.Banks & W.Suarez - Philippines

References

Podochileae genera